Pat Howard (born 1938) is a former Australian diver. She competed in the 1956 Melbourne Olympic Games and finished 17th in the 3m springboard.

Personal 
Howard's married name is Freeman.

References 

1938 births
Living people
Olympic divers of Australia
Divers at the 1956 Summer Olympics
Australian female divers
20th-century Australian women
21st-century Australian women